Li Fanghua (6 January 1932 – 24 January 2020) was a Hong Kong-born Chinese physicist. She was a member of the Chinese Academy of Sciences, The World Academy of Sciences, and the International Union of Crystallography. She was also the director of Chinese Society of Physics and China Union of Crystallography, and an editor of the Journal of Chinese Electron Microscopy Society, J. Electron Microscopy, Chinese Physics Letter, and Chinese Journal of Physics.

Li won the L'Oréal-UNESCO Awards for Women in Science in 2003. She was fluent in English, French, German, Japanese, and Russian.

Biography
On January 6, 1932, Li Fanghua was born in Hong Kong. Because his father was a business partner in Hong Kong, he settled in Hong Kong. His father Li Jiong participated in the Revolution of 1911 in his early years and served as a major general of the Fourth Army of the National Revolutionary Army.

In 1937, after the Lugouqiao Incident, in order to avoid Japanese invaders, they moved their family to Deqing County, Guangdong Province.

In 1938, her mother took her elder brother, younger brother and her back to Hong Kong alone for the sake of her children’s studies. One year later, she moved to Shanghai with her neighbors. Three years later, she moved to Beijing’s grandmother’s home. Beijing No. 56 Middle School).

In 1947, her mother took her and her younger brother back to Guangzhou, and her father arranged for her to board the second grade of Peidao Girls’ High School.

In 1949, when he graduated from high school, Li Fanghua was sent to the Department of Physics of Lingnan University, and at the same time he was admitted to the Department of Astronomy of Sun Yat-sen University. In September, she entered Lingnan University. Because the teachers often use English to give lectures, she often consults English reference books after class, so she improves her English reading ability. In October, Guangzhou was liberated and public schools opened, and she transferred to the Department of Astronomy at Sun Yat-Sen University. But because of frequent suspension of classes and drumming and going to the street to do political propaganda, she wanted to change to a school with more studies.

In 1950, Li Fanghua was admitted to the Department of Physics of Wuhan University and was still in the first year.

In 1952, the state selected students from the second year of colleges and universities to take the exam for studying abroad in the Soviet Union. Wuhan University recommended Li Fanghua to take the exam and was admitted. In March, Li Fanghua entered the Preparatory Department of Beijing Russian Language School, specializing in Russian. In the autumn of the same year, I went to the Soviet Union and entered the Department of Physics of Leningrad University, a state university of the former Soviet Union. There were also three former students from the Department of Physics of Tsinghua University, Qing Chengrui, Gu Yifan and Huang Shengnian. In order to shorten the length of study, Li Fanghua and the four of them fought to transfer to the second grade together, and obtained the approval of the dean of the department.

In 1955, Li Fanghua was in teacher Mi. Asia. Under the guidance of Rums (М.Α.Яумшь), he began to prepare his graduation thesis, the title of which was "Study on Electron Diffraction of In-situ Evaporated Bismuth Metal Thin Films".

In 1956, Li Fanghua graduated from the Department of Physics of Leningrad University in the Soviet Union.

In 1960, Shi Ruwei (then director of the Institute of Physics, Chinese Academy of Sciences) arranged for Li Fanghua to independently carry out electron diffraction research, so that she could take the scientific knowledge learned in the Soviet Union into China. "Single crystal electron diffraction" structure analysis research.

In October 1982, Li Fanghua went to the Department of Applied Physics, Osaka University, Japan as a visiting scholar (until May 1983), and carried two new domestically produced minerals: Yellow River ore and bastnaesium ore, hoping to use Japanese super-high resolution There are new discoveries in domestic minerals by the electron microscope.[6]

In 1984, Li Fanghua's research group won the second prize of the Chinese Academy of Sciences Scientific and Technological Achievement Award with the project "The establishment of lattice image and direct observation of crystal structure".[6]

In 1991, Li Fanghua won the Ye Qisun Physics Prize of the Chinese Physical Society.[6]

In 1992, Li Fanghua won the Hashimoto First Jiro Award (personal award) from the Chinese Society of Electron Microscopy.[6]

In 1993, Li Fanghua was elected as an academician of the Chinese Academy of Sciences.[6]

In 1996, Li Fanghua served as the chairman of the Chinese Society of Electron Microscopy (until 2000).[6]

In 1998, Li Fanghua was elected as an academician of the Third World Academy of Sciences.[6]

In 2002, at the time of her 70th birthday, the academic journal "Ultramicroscopy" of the International Society for Electron Microscopy published a special issue to celebrate her. 20 years ago, working photos in the conference room of the Institute of Physics of the Chinese Academy of Sciences, with Academician Li Fanghua on the right and Academician Fan Haifu on the second. Fan Haifu is an academician of the Chinese Academy of Sciences and an academician of the Third World Academy of Sciences. He is also the husband of Academician Li Fanghua.[6]

On February 27, 2003, Li Fanghua won the L'Oréal-UNESCO World Outstanding Female Scientist Achievement Award and was the first Chinese scientist to receive the award.[6]

In 2009, Li Fanghua won the He Liang He Li Foundation Science and Technology Progress Award; the monograph "Electronic Crystallography and Image Processing" written in the same year was published.[6]

Personal life
Li was married to fellow physicist Fan Haifu.

Main achievementSS
Research Summary

In 1985, Li Fanghua deduced a new and practical approximate analytical expression for high-resolution image intensity, established a practical image contrast theory, and solved the theoretical basis for the application of electronic crystallographic image processing in practice. Her research promotes the development of related disciplines and provides crystal structure information of new materials, which helps to draw the laws of the relationship between material properties, structure and technology. Her research content includes:[7]

(1) High-resolution electron microscopy and electronic crystallography

In the early 1960s, Li Fanghua first carried out electron diffraction in China to determine the structure of a single crystal. In China, he determined the position of hydrogen atoms in the crystal for the first time. The relevant literature is still cited by foreign colleagues.[8]

In the 1970s, Li Fanghua and Fan Haifu cooperated to explore the combination of diffraction methods and high-resolution electron microscopy, and created a new image processing theory and technology in high-resolution electron microscopy. Later, she and her students established an unwinding processing technology based on the principle of maximum entropy. It provides an important way to determine the tiny crystal structure. It has been successfully applied to determine the crystal structure of materials such as high-temperature superconductors.[8]

While studying in Japan in the 1980s, Li Fanghua summarized new experimental rules and developed a method for determining the position of light atoms. On this basis, after returning to China, she proposed a new image contrast theory: "pseudo-weak phase object approximation". This theory clarified the relationship between image intensity and crystal thickness for the first time, and revealed the law of changes in the intensity of different atomic images. , Is the theoretical basis of the above-mentioned image processing technology. Under the guidance of this theory, Li Fanghua et al. observed lithium atoms in crystals for the first time experimentally. In addition, she participated in the early research of high-temperature superconducting materials by means of high-resolution electron microscopy, and was one of the first groups in the world to report the presence or absence of commensurate modulation structures of bismuth superconductors.[8]

(2) Quasi-crystal

The research team led by Li Fanghua first discovered and reported the almost continuous transition process between quasicrystals and crystals, and she gave a theoretical explanation. Li Fanghua used the phase sub-strain field to derive some formulas reflecting the relationship between the quasicrystal and the crystal, and on this basis, proposed a new method to determine the structure of the quasicrystal, as well as the determination of the local phase sub-strain in the quasicrystal. method. And successfully applied to Al-Cu-Li and Al-Mn-Si quasicrystals.[8]

(3) Crystal defects

For the newly developed field emission electron microscope, Li Fanghua proposed a new research direction for measuring crystal defects with atomic resolution. At present, she has successfully measured the 60-degree dislocation at the SiGe/Si epitaxial film interface into two incomplete dislocations of 90 degrees and 30 degrees, and a piece of stacking fault sandwiched between them. This is also the first report on the defect of atomic resolution at the interface of SiGe/Si epitaxial film.[8]

References

1932 births
2020 deaths
21st-century women scientists
Chinese women physicists
L'Oréal-UNESCO Awards for Women in Science laureates
Members of the Chinese Academy of Sciences
Saint Petersburg State University alumni
Sun Yat-sen University alumni
TWAS fellows
Wuhan University alumni
Hong Kong women scientists
Hong Kong physicists
Chinese expatriates in the Soviet Union